A newsroom is the place where journalists work to gather news to be published.

Newsroom may also refer to:

Television
 Newsroom (BBC programme), a BBC2 news programme from 1964 to 1973
 Newsroom South East, BBC's news programme for southeastern England
 The Newsroom (Canadian TV series), a comedy-drama series that ran 1996–2005
 The Newsroom (American TV series), a drama series on the HBO cable channel that ran 2012–2014
 America's Newsroom, an American news/talk program on Fox News Channel that began in 2007
 CNN Newsroom, an American news program on CNN/US that began in 2006
 CNN Newsroom (CNNI), the similar CNN Newsroom on CNN International
 JTBC Newsroom, a newscast of the South Korean JTBC Television Network

Other uses
 The Newsroom, now the Guardian News & Media Archive, in London
 Newsroom (website), a New Zealand news publication
 Newsroom Navigator, a collection of online resources used by reporters at The New York Times
 SPIE Newsroom, a technical news website operated by SPIE
 The Newsroom, a BBC World Service radio show